Els Schelfhout (born 1967) is a Belgian politician and a member of the Christen-Democratisch en Vlaams. She was elected as a member of the Belgian Senate in 2007.

Notes

1967 births
Living people
Christian Democratic and Flemish politicians
Members of the Senate (Belgium)
People from Sint-Gillis-Waas